The orange-speckled forest-skink (Tumbunascincus luteilateralis), monotypic in the genus Tumbunascincus, is endemic to Queensland in Australia.

References

Skinks of Australia
Reptiles described in 1980
Taxa named by Jeanette Covacevich
Taxa named by Keith R. McDonald (herpetologist)